John Landrum may refer to:
 John M. Landrum, U.S. Representative from Louisiana
 John Gill Landrum, Baptist pastor and namesake of Landrum, South Carolina